Artyom Borisovich Soroko (born 1 April 1992) is a Belarusian professional footballer who plays for Arsenal Dzerzhinsk.

Honours
BATE Borisov
Belarusian Premier League champion: 2014, 2015, 2016
Belarusian Cup winner: 2014–15
Belarusian Super Cup winner: 2013, 2014, 2015, 2016

External links
 
 
 Profile at BATE website

1992 births
Living people
Footballers from Minsk
Belarusian footballers
Association football goalkeepers
FC BATE Borisov players
FC Isloch Minsk Raion players
FC Torpedo-BelAZ Zhodino players
FC Slutsk players
FC Luch Minsk (2012) players
FC Dnyapro Mogilev players
FC Vitebsk players
FC Arsenal Dzerzhinsk players